The Minnesota Timberwolves are a National Basketball Association (NBA) team based in Minneapolis, Minnesota. They are a member of the Northwest Division of the NBA's Western Conference. In order to persuade the NBA to give Minnesota a team, Marv Wolfenson and Harvey Ratner, the future owners of the organization, conducted a "name the team" contest and eventually selected two finalists, the "Timberwolves" and the "Polars", in December 1986. The team then asked the 842 city councils in Minnesota to select the winner, as the "Timberwolves" prevailed. Minnesota was given a team, and took part in the 1989 NBA Expansion Draft with the Orlando Magic. The Timberwolves have since made eight playoff appearances, advancing to the Western Conference finals once during the 2003–04 NBA season, where they lost to the Los Angeles Lakers. Since the franchise's inception, 198 players have made an appearance in a competitive game for the team.

Of those 198 players, one has been inducted into the Naismith Memorial Basketball Hall of Fame this being Kevin Garnett. A total of 14 Minnesota players have been elected to the NBA All-Rookie Team. Only seven players, however, have made an appearance in the NBA All-Star Game while a Timberwolf: Tom Gugliotta was selected to the team in 1997 along with Kevin Garnett, who was selected from 1997–2007.  Wally Szczerbiak in 2002, Sam Cassell in 2004, and Jimmy Butler in 2018 each made one appearance. Kevin Love and Karl-Anthony Towns are the only Timberwolves, other than Garnett, to make multiple All-Star games: Love appeared in the 2011, 2012, and 2014 games, while Towns appeared in the 2018, 2019, and 2022 games.

Garnett holds a multitude of Minnesota's career records, including the most points, assists, rebounds, blocks, steals, field goals made, free throws, and minutes played in team history. Tony Campbell holds the career record for most points per game, with 20.6, beating Garnett by a tenth of a point. Pooh Richardson holds the single season record for assists, accumulating 734 during the 1990–91 season, and Sam Mitchell committed a record 338 personal fouls over the same span. Other single season leaders include Tyrone Corbin for his 175 steals during the Timberwolves' inaugural 1989–1990 season, and Gugliotta for his 293 turnovers from 1996–97.

Notes
  Statistics were last updated July 11, 2022.

References
General
  Note: nationality, school/club, and years for each player are found by following the player's link on the list.

Specific

National Basketball Association all-time rosters
 
roster